Antoxya is a genus of tephritid  or fruit flies in the family Tephritidae.

Species
Antoxya oxynoides (Bezzi, 1924)

References

Tephritinae
Tephritidae genera
Diptera of Africa